Mama Bah-Yéré (born 22 July 1992) is a Beninese international footballer who plays for Lobi Stars, as a defender.

References

1992 births
Living people
Beninese footballers
Benin international footballers
Buffles du Borgou FC players
Lobi Stars F.C. players
Nigeria Professional Football League players
Association football defenders
Beninese expatriate footballers
Beninese expatriate sportspeople in Nigeria
Expatriate footballers in Nigeria